Phyllocoma (Phyllocoma) platyca is a species of sea snail, a marine gastropod mollusk in the family Muricidae, the murex snails or rock snails.

Description
The length of the shell attains 19.4 mm.

Distribution
This marine species occurs off Wallis and Futuna in the South Pacific.

References

 Houart R. (2001). Ingensia gen. nov. and eleven new species of Muricidae (Gastropoda) from New Caledonia, Vanuatu, and Wallis and Futuna Islands. pp. 243-269, in: Bouchet P. & Marshall B.A. (eds.) Tropical Deep-Sea Benthos, 22. Mémoires du Muséum National d'Histoire Naturelle 185: 243–269

Muricidae
Gastropods described in 2001